Aleksi Heimosalmi is a Finnish ice hockey player who plays for Porin Ässät as a loanee from the Carolina Hurricanes. Heimosalmi played his first Liiga game for Ässät on 10 October 2021.

Career statistics

International

References

External links
 

Living people
2003 births
Ässät players
Finnish ice hockey defencemen
Carolina Hurricanes draft picks
Sportspeople from Pori
21st-century Finnish people